This is an alphabetical list of villages in Kolar district, Karnataka, India.

A–Ad 

 A. Upparahalli
 A. Vyapalapalli
 Aalamaram
 Abakavaripalli
 Abbani
 Abbenahalli
 Abbigirihosahalli
 Abbihalli
 Achaganapalli
 Achampalli (Mulbagal)
 Achampalli (Srinivaspur)
 Achampally
 Achatnahalli
 Achepalli
 Adampalli
 Adavichambakur
 Adavigollavarahalli
 Addagal (Srinivaspur)
 Addekoppa
 Adepalli
 Adiganapalli
 Adikarahatti
 Adinarayanahalli
 Adirajapalli

Ag–Av 

 Agalakote (Malur)
 Agara, Malur
 Agara, Mulbagal
 Agatamdike
 Agnihalli
 Agrahara Somarasanahalli
 Agrahara, Chintamani
 Agrahara, Malur
 Agrahara, Srinivaspur
 Agraharahosahalli
 Ahanya
 Ajjakadirenahalli
 Ajjapalli, Bangarapet
 Ajjapalli, Kolar
 Ajjappanahalli, Malur
 Ajjavara, Chik Ballapur
 Akalathimmanahalli
 Akkimangala
 Akshantaragollahalli
 Allipura
 Andersonpet
 Ankathatti
 Araleri
 Avani, Kolar

Balagere 

 Budikote
 Byrakur
 Chelur
 Devarayasamudra
 Doddakallahalli
 Gattahalli
 Gownipalli
 Guttahalli, Bangarapet North
 Guttahalli, Bangarapet South
 Guttahalli, Kolar Gold Fields
 Guttahalli, Kolar South
 Guttahalli, Kolar West
 Hebbani
 Hossur
 Hulkuru 
 Huthur

J–K 

 Jagadenahalli
 Jangamakote
 Jogal Kasti
 Kalkunte
 Kanchala
 Kataripalya
 Kurudumale
 Kyalanur

M–P 

 Maasti
 Manchenahalli
 Mandikal
 Marandahalli, Kolar
 Marasanapalli
 Masthi
 Mullur
 Nangali
 Padakasti
 Palar Nagar

R–Z 

 Rampura
 Tayalur
 Therhalli
 Uttanur

Kolar district